Archaeonectrus is an extinct genus of pliosaur from the Early Jurassic (Sinemurian) of what is now southeastern England. The type species is Archaeonectrus (originally "Plesiosaurus") rostratus, first named by Sir Richard Owen in 1865, which was moved to its own genus by N.I. Novozhilov in 1964.

Classification
 

The cladogram below shows Archaeonectrus phylogenetic position among other plesiosaurs, following Benson et al. (2012).

See also

 Timeline of plesiosaur research
 List of plesiosaur genera

References

 Sepkoski, J.J. (2002). "A compendium of fossil marine animal genera". Bulletins of American Paleontology 363: 1-560.

External links
 Archaeonectrus in the Paleobiology Database

Jurassic plesiosaurs of Europe
Rhomaleosaurids
Fossil taxa described in 1964
Sauropterygian genera